Leopold Koretz (1879–1925) was an American lawyer and stockbroker who ran an elaborate Ponzi scheme in Chicago, called the "Bayano oil fraud," which garnered an estimated $30 million (about $450 million today) from dozens of investors in Chicago. The scheme used fraudulent claims of oil interests in Panama in a criminal career that predated his contemporary, Charles Ponzi. Koretz was so trusted and admired that after Ponzi's fraud was exposed in 1920, his investors nicknamed him "Our Ponzi," never suspecting they were being duped as well.

Early life and family
Leopold Koretz was born to German Jewish parents on July 30, 1879, in Rokycany, Bohemia, the seventh of nine children. He arrived in the United States in 1887, at age 8.

The family settled in Chicago. Koretz was a star debater at Lakeview High School. He studied at night and graduated from the Chicago-Kent College of Law in June 1901.

Career
One of Koretz's associates when he began the practice of law was Robert E. Crowe, who as the Cook County state's attorney would later investigate Koretz and arrange for his arrest.

Koretz's swindling career began in 1905, when he forged and sold a series of mortgages on non-existent properties, using the proceeds to cover interest payments and finance an opulent lifestyle. He soon graduated to land speculation in Arkansas, flogging more fake mortgages and bogus stock in Arkansas rice farms. In 1911 Koretz began selling stock in the Bayano River Syndicate, which he claimed controlled millions of acres of prime timberland in a remote region of Panama. His announcement of the "discovery" of oil on the property in 1921—and a promise of 60-percent annual returns—sparked a stock-buying frenzy in which many investors begged Koretz for a chance to invest. The scheme was exposed in November 1923 when a group of Koretz's wealthy investors traveled to Panama to see the purported oil operations and discovered the fraud.

Koretz fled to New York City, and then to Nova Scotia, Canada, where he posed as Lou Keyte, a wealthy retiree and literary figure. He purchased and renovated a secluded lodge near present-day Kejimkujik National Park, in southwestern Nova Scotia, where he lavishly entertained a new circle of friends that included the American writer Zane Grey and future Canadian author Thomas Raddall. Koretz was identified and arrested in Halifax on November 23, 1924, through a suit he had brought to a tailor for repair of the lining, on which a label with his real name was sewn in along with the name of the Chicago clothier from whom it had been purchased. He was extradited to Chicago and pleaded guilty.

Charles Ponzi is said to have swindled investors out of $20 million in 1920 ($300 million in current dollars), in a con immortalized as a Ponzi scheme. Leo Koretz is estimated from 1905 through 1923 to have bilked his family members and other unsuspecting investors of $30 million, equivalent to $450 million today. By comparison, the victims of Bernard Madoff's Ponzi schemes between the early 1990s and 2008 were believed by the U.S. Security Investors Protection Corporation to have lost as much as $65 billion.

Personal life
Koretz married into a comfortable German Jewish family on January 30, 1906. Koretz and his wife, the former Mae Isabel Mayer, had a son, Mentor (later known as Red Kearns), and a daughter, Mari.

Death

Shortly after he was sent to the state prison in Joliet, the 45-year-old Koretz, who had been diabetic since 1919, died on January 8, 1925, of an apparent suicide when he deliberately ate an entire box of smuggled-in chocolates with the intention of triggering a fatal diabetic coma. Koretz was buried the following afternoon in a graveside service at Waldheim Cemetery Co. in Forest Park, Illinois.

References

1879 births
1925 deaths
Pyramid and Ponzi schemes
American people convicted of fraud
American confidence tricksters
1925 suicides
People who committed suicide in prison custody
Suicides in Illinois
Austro-Hungarian emigrants to the United States